Robert Fairweather may refer to:

 Robert Fairweather (cricketer) (1845–1925), Australian cricketer
 Gordon Fairweather, Canadian politician
 Rob Fairweather, American Acting Director of the Office of Management and Budget